Lipin is a Russian masculine surname, its feminine counterpart is Lipina. Notable people with the surname include:

Alexander Lipin (born 1985), Kazakhstani ice hockey player
Maksim Lipin (born 1992), Estonian footballer

Russian-language surnames